Sounds of Revival is a live album by Pastor William McDowell, and his fourth album release. Entertainment One Music released the album on January 22, 2016. McDowell worked with Clay Brogan III, in the production of this album.

Background
This album was recorded in Baton Rouge, Louisiana, with a congregation of 3,000 worshippers, at Bethany Church, on June 5, 2015. He got Clay Bogan III to produce the album.

Critical reception

Awarding the album five stars at Worship Leader, Darryl Bryant states, "Sounds of Revival is a powerhouse project from start to finish. With lush vocal arrangements and orchestration, this is big production at its finest."

Track listing

Chart performance

References

2016 live albums
E1 Music albums